Sona Tata Condé is an internationally recognised  Guinean musician. Sona Tata is a member of the Mandinka ethnic group. Sona Tata is widely popular in Guinea, especially in the capital Conakry. Sona Tata Condé recorded her afro-pop album Simbo which is named after her husband, in 2007. The title track, Simbo, is a love song to her husband and like many of her other songs, is not only sung in her native Malinke, but in other languages used in Guinea's capital, Conakry, including the Fula, Susu, French and English languages. .

References
https://web.archive.org/web/20110715190850/http://rkk-music.com/product_info.php?language=en&info=p17_CD--Sona-Tata-Conde---Simbo-.html&XTCsid=afe05407d775dbbc82d19efa02952483
 Radio Kan-Kan endorsement

Year of birth missing (living people)
Living people
Guinean women singers
Mandinka